St Mark's Church, Leicester is a Grade II* listed former parish church in the Church of England in Leicester, Leicestershire.

History

The foundation stone was laid in 1870 by the Bishop of Peterborough. The church was the gift of William Perry-Herrick and built to the designs of the architect Ewan Christian. The contractor for the foundations was Firn of Leicester, Osbourne of Leicester constructed the building. The clerk of works was James Nichols. The bells were supplied by Taylor of Loughborough, and the clock was from Moore of Clerkenwell, London.

The church was consecrated on 25 April 1872 by the Bishop of Peterborough.

The stained glass windows inserted at the time of the consecration in the chancel were by Ward and Hughes. Later additions include windows in the south east chapel by Henry Holiday in 1893 and in the north east chapel by Charles Eamer Kempe in 1895.

The west end was completed in 1903 by Ernest Charles Shearman.

The apse contained a painting by James Eadie Reid dating from 1910 “The Triumph and Apotheosis of Labour”.

Redundancy and subsequent use 

The church was made redundant by the Church of England in 1986 after which it remained vacant until being converted into a conference and wedding venue known as The Empire Banqueting Hall in 2005.

Organ

The pipe organ was built by William Hill & Sons in 1871. A specification of the organ can be found on the National Pipe Organ Register.

References

External links
The Empire Banqueting Hall

Church of England church buildings in Leicester
Grade II* listed churches in Leicestershire
Churches completed in 1872
Ewan Christian buildings